Camille Limoges (born 31 May 1942, in Montreal) is the former deputy minister of the Ministry of Higher Education, Research, Science and Technology in Quebec, Canada.

Ten years later, he became the deputy minister of Quebec's newly created .

He also served from 1989 to 1990 as president of ACFAS. The Government of Quebec integrated a number of proposals developed by the CST into its policy on science and technology, announced in January 2000.

Limoges received his PhD from the Sorbonne in 1968, studying under Georges Canguilhem.  One of his most influential students is historian of biology Jan Sapp.

Limoges was appointed a member of the Order of Canada on 16 November 2010, but he resigned from the Order on 26 January 2013, for personal reasons.

References

https://web.archive.org/web/20070228185516/http://www.sshrc.ca/web/about/members/limoges_e.asp

Quebec civil servants
Academic staff of the Université de Montréal
Historians of science
University of Paris alumni
1942 births
Living people